David or Dave Douglas may refer to:

Entertainment
 David Douglas (director) (born 1953), Canadian cinematographer, director and writer
 Dave Douglas (trumpeter) (born 1963), American jazz trumpeter
 Dave Douglas (drummer) (born 1979), American drummer
 David Douglas, character in An Act of Murder

Nobility
 David Douglas, 12th Marquess of Queensberry (born 1929), Scottish nobleman
 David Douglas, 7th Earl of Angus (c. 1515–1558), Scottish nobleman

Sports
 Dave Douglas (golfer) (1918–1978), American professional golfer
 David Douglas (offensive lineman) (1963–2016), American football player
 David Douglas (rower) (born 1947), Australian
 David Douglas (fighter) (born 1982), American mixed martial arts fighter
 David Douglas (wide receiver) (born 1989), American football wide receiver

Other
 David Douglas, Lord Reston (1769–1819), Scottish judge and Adam Smith's heir
 David Douglas (botanist) (1799–1834), Scottish botanist
 David Douglas (publisher) (1823–1918), Scottish publisher
 David L. Douglas (1845–1913), American businessman and politician
 David C. Douglas (1898–1982), British historian of the Normans
 David "Dathaí" Douglas (died 2016), an Irish criminal
 David Douglas High School, a public high school in Portland, Oregon

See also
David Douglass (disambiguation)
David Douglas Duncan (1916–2018), American photojournalist
David Douglas Wagener (1792–1860), U.S. politician
Mount David Douglas, a mountain in Oregon named after the Scottish botanist